Live is an album by American musician Terri Hendrix; it is Hendrix' first live album.

Band
 Terri Hendrix: vocals, guitar, mandolin, harmonica, papoose
 Lloyd Maines: guitar, steel, dobro
 Glenn Fukunaga: bass 
 Paul Pearcy: drums

Track listing
 The Know How
 Two Dollar Shoes
 La Mazet
 Fisherman's Blues
 Sister's Song
 Wallet
 You Mangled My Dog
 Clicker
 Dana Blues
 Who Needs You
 Blue Eyed Cowboy
 Gravity 
 Take Me Places
 If Love Was A Train
 Wind Me Up

References

Terri Hendrix albums
1999 live albums